History of Humanities is a double-blind peer-reviewed academic journal devoted to the history of the different traditions and disciplines in the humanities, across periods and cultures. Its current editors are Rens Bod, Julia Kursell, Jaap Maat, and Thijs Weststeijn.

The journal discusses the history of antiquarianism, archaeology, art history, classics, historiography, linguistics, literary studies, media studies, musicology, Oriental studies, philology, theater studies, and religious studies, as well as interactions between these disciplines and relevant developments in the sciences and social sciences. It publishes original research papers, thematic forums, review essays, and book reviews. It appears twice per year and is published by the University of Chicago Press like its counterpart devoted to the history of the (natural) sciences, Isis.

Topic and agenda 

The journal was founded on the basis of the belief that, in contrast to the history of science, the various humanities disciplines had rarely been studied in an interconnected manner, which may partly have contributed to current sentiments of a "crisis" in the humanities. In the first issue (2016), the editors state that:
“Our journal is meant to stand for the fact that scholarly practices of a type today labeled “humanities” have been an essential part of the process of knowledge making ever since human inquisitiveness sought to enhance our understanding of the world and ourselves. This long history has been studied in fruitful and illuminating ways, but the focus has been on either the natural sciences or on single disciplines within the humanities, such as history writing and linguistics. The fundamental contribution of the humanities to the intricate web of knowledge that scholars, thinkers, and researchers have spun in the course of several millennia has thus been poorly recognized and is consequently undervalued. We intend to redress the imbalance in the historiography of the search for knowledge that mankind has been engaged in for so long. A more balanced picture, we believe, will show that the ways we arrive at knowledge are complex, varied, and unpredictable and often involve the transmission of methods and insights from one field of investigation to another."

The journal is the brainchild of the Society for the History of the Humanities which also organizes a series of conferences, “The Making of the Humanities,” in Amsterdam (2008, 2010, 2018), Rome (2012, 2014), Baltimore (2016), Oxford (2017), Cape Town (2019), Barcelona (2021), and Pittsburgh (2022). It has earlier published a trilogy, The Making of the Humanities (Amsterdam University Press), which tested the ground for the founding of the journal in 2016.

Indexing 

Articles that appear in History of Humanities are indexed in the following abstracting and indexing services:
Ulrich's Periodicals Directory
Ulrichsweb
EBSCOHOST
Humanities International Index
Humanities Source Ultimate
TOC Premier

References

External links 
History of Humanities | List of Issues

Publications established in 2016
History journals
University of Chicago Press academic journals